Richard Raymond Collingwood Wells (born 19 January 1956) is a Rhodesian-born English former first-class cricketer.

Wells was born in Southern Rhodesia at Salisbury in January 1956. He was educated in England at Cranleigh School, before going up to Christ Church, Oxford. While studying at Oxford, he played first-class cricket for Oxford University in 1977 and 1978, making eleven appearances. He scored 212 runs in his eleven matches, at an average of 13.25 and a high score of 85, which came against Leicestershire in 1977.

References

External links

1956 births
Living people
People from Harare
Rhodesian emigrants to the United Kingdom
People educated at Cranleigh School
Alumni of Christ Church, Oxford
English cricketers
Oxford University cricketers